The Diamond Master is a 1929 film serial directed by Jack Nelson. The film is considered to be lost. It is based on a story by Jacques Futrelle who was one of the 1500 victims in the Titanic disaster in 1912.

Cast
 Hayden Stevenson as Mark Van Cortland Wynne
 Louise Lorraine as Doris Killner
 Al Hart as Randolph Latham
 Monte Montague as Van's Manservant
 Louis Stern as John Killner
 Walter Maly

Chapter titles
 The Secret of the Night 
 The Diamond of Death 
 The Tunnel of Terror 
 Trapped 
 The Diamond Machine 
 The Wolf Pack 
 The Death Trap 
 Into the Flames 
 The Last Stand 
 The Reckoning

See also
 List of American films of 1929
 List of film serials
 List of film serials by studio

References

External links

1929 films
American silent serial films
American black-and-white films
Universal Pictures film serials
Films directed by Jack Nelson
Lost American films
1920s American films